Gustavo Rivera is the name of:

 Gustavo Rivera (politician) (born 1975), American politician
 Gustavo Rivera (soccer) (born 1993), Puerto Rican soccer player

See also 
 Rivera (disambiguation)